Captain Aston Dalzell Piper,  (19 April 1913 – 8 November 1995), known as Peter Piper, was an officer in the Royal Naval Reserve in the Second World War. He was notable for two events: he was the first reservist to command a submarine, and the first reservist officer to receive the Distinguished Service Cross in the Second World War.

Early life and career
Piper was educated at Dovercourt High School, followed by Ardingly College. He spent three years in the Merchant Navy, mostly with the United Baltic Steamship Line. During his time in the Merchant Navy, he served on, amongst other ships, the SS Baltraffic as navigator. He joined the Royal Naval Reserve on 18 March 1932.

Naval service
While aboard , he won two Bars to his DSC: one for "successful and aggressive patrols", and one for the sinking of U-374.

Piper then commanded  for fourteen patrols, sinking several ships and on one occasion scoring four hits with four torpedoes. For these patrols he was awarded the Distinguished Service Order.

References

1913 births
1995 deaths
Royal Navy officers of World War II
British Merchant Navy officers
People educated at Ardingly College
Companions of the Distinguished Service Order
Recipients of the Distinguished Service Cross (United Kingdom)
Military personnel from Essex
Royal Naval Reserve personnel